AAU most commonly refers to:
 Association of American Universities, a selective group of 65 major research universities in North America

AAU may also refer to:

Education
 Aalborg University, in Denmark
 Academy of Art University, in San Francisco, California, United States
 Addis Ababa University, in Ethiopia
 Allied American University, Laguna Hills, California, United States
 Alpen-Adria-University of Klagenfurt, in Austria
 Anand Agricultural University, in Anand, Gujarat, India
 Anglo-American University, in Prague, Czech Republic
 Antillean Adventist University, in Mayagüez, Puerto Rico
 Assam Agricultural University, in Jorhat, Assam, India
 Association of African Universities

Healthcare
 Acute assessment unit, in a UK hospital
 Acute anterior uveitis, an inflammation of the middle layer of the eye

Other uses
 AAU, a codon for the amino acid asparagine
 Abau language, a language of Papua New Guinea
 Allgemeine Arbeiter-Union – Einheitsorganisation, a German communist organisation
 Alpha acid unit, a measure of the bitterness of hops used in brewing beer
 Amateur Athletic Union, an amateur sports organization in the United States
 Amendment to allege use, a legal term
 Asau Airport in Asau, Samoa 
 Assigned amount units, emission allowances created and allocated under the Marrakech Accords of the Kyoto protocol
 Americanos U.S.A., an American bus company